Jessica (Jess, J.D.) Nordell is an American writer, science journalist, and author.

Early life and education

Nordell was born in Los Angeles, California and raised in Green Bay, Wisconsin. Nordell attended MIT and received a B.A. in physics from Harvard University. She later earned a certificate in visual art from the Minneapolis College of Art and Design and an MFA in poetry from the University of Wisconsin-Madison, where she was the Martha Meier Renk Distinguished Poetry Fellow.

Writing

Nordell was a staff comedy writer from 2003-2005 for A Prairie Home Companion a live radio variety show hosted by Garrison Keillor. While on staff, she co-created and produced the interview series Literary Friendships, featuring writer pairs Michael Chabon and Ayelet Waldman, Sandra Cisneros and Joy Harjo, Michael Cunningham and Marie Howe, Robert Bly and Donald Hall, and Dana Gioia and Kay Ryan. The series won a 2006 Gracie Award from American Women in Radio and Television. From 2006-2007, Nordell was associate producer for On Being with Krista Tippett.

Her science journalism and writings on bias, prejudice, and discrimination have appeared in the New York Times, the Atlantic, the Guardian, the Washington Post, the New Republic, Slate, and Salon.

Nordell's poems have appeared in FIELD. Her essay "Another One Rides the Cometbus," an appreciation of Aaron Cometbus's Cometbus magazine, appeared in the essay collection Before the Mortgage: Real Stories of Brazen Loves, Broken Leases, and the Perplexing Pursuit of Adulthood.

Nordell's first book The End of Bias: A Beginning (The Science and Practice of Overcoming Unconscious Bias) was a finalist for the 2021 Royal Society Science Book Prize, the 2022 J. Anthony Lukas Prize for Excellence in Nonfiction, and the 2022 NYPL Helen Bernstein Book Award for Excellence in Journalism. It was named a best book of the year by Greater Book, Inc., and AARP.

Publications
Books
 The End of Bias: A Beginning: The Science and Practice of Overcoming Unconscious Bias (September 21, 2021) 
Selected Writings on Bias and Discrimination
This is How Everyday Sexism Could Stop You From Getting That Promotion, New York Times (October, 2021)
Is This How Discrimination Ends? Atlantic (April, 2017)
The Visitor, The New York Times (November, 2008)
Positions of Power: How female ambition is shaped, Slate.com (November, 2006)

References

External links
A Prairie Home Companion
Before the Mortgage
JessicaNordell.com
 (See Roxanne Coady.)

Living people
Harvard University alumni
American women poets
Poets from Wisconsin
American radio producers
University of Wisconsin–Madison alumni
Minneapolis College of Art and Design alumni
Year of birth missing (living people)
21st-century American women
Women radio producers